"I Want You" is a song by English singer-songwriter Juliet Roberts, released in March 1994 as the second single from her debut album, Natural Thing (1994). Originally released as a double A-side with her song "Again", it was then released as its own single following the success of its predecessor, "Caught in the Middle", in 1994. It peaked at number one on the US Billboard Hot Dance Club Play chart, and also reached number 44 on the Billboard Hot 100. In Europe, it charted in the UK, where it peaked at number 28 on the UK Singles Chart, but was more successful on the UK Dance Singles Chart, reaching number three in October 1994.

Critical reception
Larry Flick from Billboard wrote, "Roberts easily rises above the throng of big-voiced dance divas by working a delivery that includes more than merely belting high-pitch shrieks. She has an interesting middle range and a playful style of phrasing that is further embellished by immeasurable charisma. All these elements add up to a gleeful pop/disco anthem that is essential for club disciples, as well as those at pop radio who are brave enough to go for something fresh and exciting." Dave Sholin from the Gavin Report said, "She cites Sam Cooke, Gladys Knight and the Temptations as some of her early musical influences, and that propensity for soul music is evident on this track." He added, "Full of high energy and exciting." Chuck Campbell from Knoxville News Sentinel viewed it as a "uplifting single" and a "joyous dance number with a great hook." In his weekly UK chart commentary, James Masterton deemed it "a fairly standard piece of dance/soul". 

Pan-European magazine Music & Media commented, "'Canned violins' make a striking intro to the 'monster album edit' only, without doubt the most suitable remix of the fast soul song for daytime radio play." Andy Beevers from Music Week gave it four out of five, saying, "This very catchy song was released earlier this year as the flipside to the ballad "Again". Now it gets the star billing it always deserved. The new remixes from K Klass and Junior Vasquez have taken it to the UK Club Chart and another crossover hit is on the cards." He also noted in the magazine's RM Dance Update, "Having sat back and reaped the belated rewards of her old recordings in 1993, Juliet Roberts eventually gets to release a brand new track. The good news is that it has been well worth waiting for. "I Want You" features the usual big vocal performance that has bags of soul and does not fall short in the catchiness stakes." Another editor, James Hamilton, declared it as a "soaringly wailed bouncy chanter".

Music video
A music video was produced to promote the song, directed by American filmmaker and comic artist Antoine Fuqua.

Track listings
 12-inch, UK (1994)
 "I Want You" (Our Tribe mix)
 "I Want You" (K-Klass Dominoe dub) 
 "I Want You" (Monster club mix)

 CD single, UK (1994)
 "I Want You" (Monster album edit) — 4:06
 "I Want You" (Our Tribe edit) — 4:17
 "I Want You" (K-Klass Klub mix) — 7:06
 "I Want You" (Monster club mix) — 8:53
 "I Want You" (Our Tribe mix) — 7:14
 "I Want You" (K-Klass Dominoe dub) — 5:50

 CD maxi, US (1994)
 "I Want You" (single edit) — 4:05
 "I Want You" (extended mix) — 7:09
 "Force of Nature" (album version) — 4:21
 "I Want You" (Monster club mix) — 9:57
 "I Want You" (album version) — 5:00

Charts

Weekly charts

Year-end charts

References

 

1994 singles
1994 songs
British disco songs
Cooltempo Records singles
English pop songs
Music videos directed by Antoine Fuqua